Nate Johnston (born December 18, 1966) is an American professional basketball player. He played briefly in the NBA for the Utah Jazz and the Portland Trail Blazers during the 1989-90 season. Johnston, a 6'8" forward, played collegiately at the University of Tampa from 1984–1988. Johnston was one of the first players drafted by the Miami Heat when they selected him in the third round (59th overall) of the 1988 NBA draft, prior to their inaugural season.

External links 
 College & NBA stats @ basketballreference.com
 Nate Johnston draft profile @ thedraftreview.com

1966 births
Living people
African-American basketball players
American expatriate basketball people in Argentina
American expatriate basketball people in Chile
American expatriate basketball people in Portugal
American expatriate basketball people in Spain
American expatriate basketball people in Turkey
American expatriate basketball people in Venezuela
American men's basketball players
Basketball players from Birmingham, Alabama
CAB Madeira players
Gaiteros del Zulia players
Grand Rapids Hoops players
Liga ACB players
Miami Heat draft picks
Piratas de Quebradillas players
Portland Trail Blazers players
Power forwards (basketball)
Quad City Thunder players
Rapid City Thrillers players
Small forwards
Tampa Spartans men's basketball players
Trotamundos B.B.C. players
Utah Jazz players
21st-century African-American people
20th-century African-American sportspeople
Titanes de Morovis players